The Method Actors were an American post-punk/new wave musical group from Athens, Georgia, United States, founded by Vic Varney and David Gamble in 1979 while at the University of Georgia.

Discography

Singles and EPs
This Is It 7" ep: "The Method" / "Can't Act" / "Bleeding" (AS006 - Armageddon Records, 1980)
Rhythms of You 10" ep: "Distortion" / "Privilege"/ "Dancing Underneath" / "No Condition" / "She" / "You" / "My Time" (AEP12005 - Armageddon Records, 1981)
Dancing Underneath 12" EP (DB, 1981)
"Rang-a-Tang" / "Big Red Brain" 7" (P1004 - Press Records, 1981)
"Round World" / "E-Y-E"  7" single (AS 011 - Armageddon Records, 1981)
 Commotion (dance mix) / Bleeding 12" dance single (Press P2004, 1981)
Live in a Room! EP (Press Records, 1982)

Albums
Little Figures 2 x LP (MAD1 - Armageddon Records, 1981)
Little Figures 1 x LP (Press Records, 1982)
Luxury LP (Press Records, 1983)
Luxury 2 x LP (P 4004 - Press Records, 1985)
This Is Still It CD (Acute Records, 2010)

Members
 Vic Varney: vocals, guitar, bass
 David Gamble: drums, vocals
 Michael Richmond: guitar, bass, backing vocals
 Robert Schmid: drums
 Stan Satin: saxophone, percussion, vocals

See also
Music of Athens, Georgia

External links 
entry in trouser press
[ allmusic guide]
Official Vic Varney Website

American post-punk music groups
Musical groups established in 1979
Musical groups disestablished in 1982
Musical groups from Georgia (U.S. state)